The 1888 Liverpool West Derby by-election was held on August 10, 1888 after the resignation of the incumbent Conservative Party MP Claud Hamilton.  It was retained by the unopposed Conservative Candidate William Cross.

References

1888 elections in the United Kingdom
West Derby, 1888
1888 in England
1880s in Liverpool
August 1888 events